Nikola Stijaković (born 10 March 1989) is a Bosnian Serb football goalkeeper.

External sources
 Profile at Srbijafudbal
 Nikola Stijaković Stats at Utakmica.rs

1989 births
Living people
Footballers from Sarajevo
Serbs of Bosnia and Herzegovina
Association football goalkeepers
Bosnia and Herzegovina footballers
Serbian footballers
FK Obilić players
FK Palilulac Beograd players
FK BSK Borča players
FK Spartak Subotica players
NK Zvijezda Gradačac players
FC VSS Košice players
Serbian SuperLiga players
Premier League of Bosnia and Herzegovina players
Slovak Super Liga players
Bosnia and Herzegovina expatriate footballers
Expatriate footballers in Slovakia
Bosnia and Herzegovina expatriate sportspeople in Slovakia